Gostyń may refer to:
Gostyń, a town in Greater Poland Voivodeship (west-central Poland)
Gostyń, Lower Silesian Voivodeship (south-west Poland)
Gostyń, Silesian Voivodeship (south Poland)
Gostyń, West Pomeranian Voivodeship (north-west Poland)
Gostyn, Illinois, a neighborhood, United States